The Deputy Leader of the Government in the House of Commons assists the Government House Leader and coordinates with the Chief Government Whip. The position is currently held by Sherry Romanado.

List of Deputy House Leaders

References

Canadian ministers